Arhopala ate is a butterfly in the family Lycaenidae. It was described by William Chapman Hewitson in 1863. It is found in the Australasian realm.

Subspecies
 A. a. ate Ambon, Serang
 A. a. aruana (Evans, 1957) Aru
 A. a. jobina (Evans, 1957) Jobi, Biak, Noemfoor, New Guinea

References

External links
Arhopala Boisduval, 1832 at Markku Savela's Lepidoptera and Some Other Life Forms. Retrieved June 3, 2017.

Arhopala
Butterflies described in 1863